The Gurminj Museum of Musical Instruments ( or Gurminj Museum) is a museum located in the center of Dushanbe, Tajikistan, behind the Office of the Mayor on Bokhtar Street.

History 
The museum was founded in 1990 by Gurminj Zavkibekov (1929–2003), Tajik actor and musician, who was honored as a National Artist of Tajikistan and a laureate of the most prestigious national prize in arts for significant contributions to the cultural heritage of Tajikistan - the Rudaki State Prize. After his death in 2003, his son Iqbol Zavkibekov (also a professional musician) took charge of the Museum.

Collection 
There are about 100 musical instruments in the Museum collection mostly representing the Pamiri and Badakhshani musical tradition. The collection is dominated by string instruments, such as the tar, rubab, Pamiri rubab, tanbur, dutor, setor, qashqar, and ghizhak. There are also number of drums such as tabl, daf,  and doyra.
 
The collection was gathered by Gurminj Zavkibekov during his trips to his native Kuhistoni-Badakhshon. There are a number of other instruments that do not belong to the Pamiri traditional instruments and some other antiquarian casual items are on display at the museum.

Cultural events 
The museum also hosts a variety of cultural gatherings and events, many featuring the Tajik musical ensemble Shams and their soloist Nobovar Chanorov. Gurminj's son Iqbol Zavkibekov is the arts director of the band, which operates out of an apartment near the museum.

See also 
 List of music museums

References

External links 
Official Website
Dushanbe at a glance: culture in Dushanbe by US Embassy Tajikistan
Selected photos of the Museum on naison.tj

Museums in Tajikistan
Buildings and structures in Dushanbe
Tajikistan
Musical instrument museums
Museums established in 1990
Music organizations based in Tajikistan